= German Army Handbook 1939–1945 =

German Army Handbook 1939–1945, by W. J. K. Davies, is a small book covering the organization, equipment, and doctrine of the German Heer (and incidentally the Waffen-SS) during World War II. Though brief, it includes a thorough collection of tables, diagrams, illustrations, and photographs, and is useful as a concise introduction to the nature of the Wehrmacht's ground forces of the period.

== Known editions ==
- Davies, W.J.K. (1977) [1973]. German Army Handbook 1939-1945 (Second U.S. ed.). New York: Arco Publishing. ISBN 0-668-04291-5.
